Danil Kopach (born 14 July 2000) is a Belarusian professional footballer who plays for Neman Grodno.

References

External links 
 Profile at Neman Grodno website
 
 

2000 births
Living people
Belarusian footballers
Association football midfielders
FC Neman Grodno players
FC Smorgon players
FC Slonim-2017 players
FC Lida players